Switch is a 1991 American fantasy comedy film written and directed by Blake Edwards. Based on George Axelrod's 1959 play Goodbye Charlie (and the 1964 film of the same title), the film stars Ellen Barkin, Jimmy Smits, JoBeth Williams, and Lorraine Bracco.

Plot 
Ad man Steve Brooks — a promiscuous  misogynist and quintessential chauvinist — is invited to a deadly surprise party by three former lovers. Margo, Liz and Felicia try to drown him in the hot tub. When that fails, Margo shoots him point blank in the chest, killing him.

In Purgatory, God (communicating through male and female voices) gives Steve one chance at redemption. He is returned to Earth, alive, and told that he must find a soulmate who truly loves him. If he fails, he will go to Hell.

The Devil convinces God to give Steve a challenge, taking his infamous charm into account, and Steve is transformed into a beautiful woman, Amanda. Amanda goes to Margo, convinces her of her real identity as Steve and persuades her to give her lessons in being a woman.

Telling everyone that Steve has run off and that she is his half-sister, Amanda moves into Steve's life, convincing his boss at the advertising agency, Arnold Friedkin, to give her Steve's job, which partly involves getting a plum account with lesbian cosmetics magnate Sheila Faxton.

Amanda tries to use her new female body as a weapon in her campaign to get the account and to win a woman's love. Sheila responds, but Amanda balks on following through on the seduction. Margo reminds her that homophobia was one of the traits that made Steve so hateful. Amanda breaks up with Sheila, telling her that the romance was contrived to get her as a client. The agency keeps the account but Sheila is furious at Amanda.

When Amanda prays to God for help, the Devil offers her a job with his operation. She refuses and calls all the names in Steve's address book, hoping to find a woman who has something kind to say about him. Instead she discovers just how hated Steve is, and how deeply she as him damaged countless women. In the course of the film, Amanda also begins to understand how women live and resents the way men — including herself as Steve — perversely treat them.

Steve's best friend, Walter Stone, has been attracted to Amanda from their first meeting and, when despair sends her on a bender, he joins her. They get drunk together and Amanda convinces Walter that she is Steve. One night after a bar fight and they both get drunk, they have sex.

In the morning, Amanda has no memory of the encounter and accuses Walter of raping her while she was passed out — the same thing Steve himself would have done. He is astonished, insisting that she was not only awake but an enthusiastic participant. Amanda recognizes the difference between the man she used to be as Steve and the far better man that Walter is.

Meanwhile, Steve's body has been found in the river and Margo plants her gun in Amanda's sofa, framing her for the crime. When Amanda is found unfit for trial, she is committed to the mental hospital, where she learns she is pregnant with Walter's child. There are dangerous complications, but she insists on carrying the baby to term. Walter proposes, and Amanda reluctantly accepts: they are married. Months pass, and with Walter beside her, Amanda gives birth to a baby girl. The newborn infant gazes at her mother with love, and Amanda dies, having earned a place in Heaven.

Upon arriving in Heaven, Amanda must decide whether to spend eternity as a male or a female angel. She finds the decision difficult, especially after, five years later, she watches as Walter and their daughter bring flowers to her grave. God, in their dual voices, reassures Amanda that she has all eternity to decide.

Cast 

God is voiced by Linda Gary and Richard Provost.

Reception 
The film received mixed to negative reviews and holds a 35% rating on Rotten Tomatoes from 23 reviews, with an average rating of 4.90/10. On Metacritic, the film has a weighted average score of 48 out of 100 based on 23 critics, indicating "mixed or average reviews".

It debuted at No. 2 at the box office. Roger Ebert gave it 2 1/2 out of 4 stars. He saw unfulfilled potential: "If Edwards had somehow found a way to really grapple with the implications of his story - if he had pushed to see how far he could go - Switch might have been a truly revolutionary comedy, on the order of Tootsie but more sexually frank..."

Legacy 
Although Switch was not a success at the box office, Ellen Barkin was nominated for a Golden Globe for her role, while Bruce Payne was described as a "delightfully wicked Satan" by Film Review.

This film was indirectly referenced numerous times throughout the long-running series Mystery Science Theater 3000. In the original television spots for the film, Jimmy Smits' name was announced in an unusual way: "Ellen Barkin. Switch. Jimmy Smits. Starts Friday." The writers of MST3K found it amusing that Smits' name was announced after the title and not announced as "also starring Jimmy Smits" or "with Jimmy Smits", only as "Jimmy Smits". Smits became a running gag on the series: in various episodes, a character of the show would say "Jimmy Smits" whenever the word "switch" was uttered or sometimes for seemingly no reason at all.

Music 
The motion picture was supposed to have a soundtrack composed and arranged by Henry Mancini, who shares composer credits with Don Grady, but Mancini's score was ultimately replaced by a variation of Joni Mitchell's song "Both Sides, Now", done by Paul Young/Clannad. Both the unused Mancini score and the pop song soundtrack were produced on CD in 1991, as a result of which two motion picture soundtrack albums exist for the film.

Henry Mancini score

 Main Title - Theme from "Switch" - 2:10
 Something for Pizzi - 4:00
 Amanda and the Devil - 2:25
 Seduction - 3:17
 Dukes - 3:00
 It's All There (Song from "Switch" Instrumental) - 3:22
 They Marry - 3:34
 Fashion Show - 1:42
 End Title - Theme from "Switch" - 4:30

Pop soundtrack

 Lyle Lovett - "You Can't Resist It" - 3:05
 Ronnie Milsap - "Old Habits Are Hard to Break" - 5:32
 Bruce Hornsby and the Range - "Barren Ground" - 4:53
 Paul Young/Clannad - "Both Sides, Now" - 5:10
 Nathalie Archangel - "So Quiet, So Still" - 4:10
 Pretty Boy Floyd - "Slam Dunk"  - 2:55
 Joe Ely - "Are You Listenin' Lucky?" - 3:34
 Indecent Obsession - "Dream After Dream" - 4:06
 The Jets - "Sendin' Out a Message" - 4:03
 Jody Watley - "It's All There" - 2:38
 Billie Holiday - "Lover Man" - 3:18

References

External links 
 
 
 
 

1991 films
1991 LGBT-related films
1990s English-language films
1991 romantic comedy films
1990s sex comedy films
American fantasy comedy films
American satirical films
American sex comedy films
Lesbian-related films
Fiction about purgatory
Films about reincarnation
Films set in New York City
Films directed by Blake Edwards
Films with screenplays by Blake Edwards
Films scored by Henry Mancini
Warner Bros. films
1990s American films